Hakea archaeoides is a large shrub or small tree commonly known as Big Nellie hakea and is endemic to forest areas on the north coast of New South Wales, Australia. It has clusters of red and greenish yellow flowers in the flowering season.

Description
Small branches and young leaves are densely covered in short red-brown silky hairs. The sepals and petals are green and smooth green glabrous or with scattered hairs in bud. Flowers are a red and greenish-yellow and appear in pendant axillary clusters in leaf axils from spring to early summer.

Taxonomy and naming
Hakea archaeoides was first formally described in 1999 by  William Barker and published in "Flora of Australia" from a specimen collected near Coopernook. The specific epithet  (archaeoides) refers to this species' similarity to primitive hakeas as revealed in cladograms.

Distribution and habitat
Hakea archaeoides is restricted to Taree and Wauchope areas in north-eastern New South Wales growing in wet sclerophyll forest and rainforest on hill slopes.

Conservation
This hakea is listed as "vulnerable" under the Australian Government Environment Protection and Biodiversity Conservation Act 1999 and the New South Wales Biodiversity Conservation Act 2016.

References

archaeoides
Flora of New South Wales
Plants described in 1999
Taxa named by William Robert Barker